Jessica McNamee (born 16 June 1988) is an Australian actress. She rose to fame in Australia playing roles in the Seven Network television programs Home and Away and Packed to the Rafters. From 2014 to 2015, she starred as patrol officer Theresa Kelly in the USA Network series Sirens.  Her film roles include The Vow (2012), Chips (2017), Battle of the Sexes (2017), The Meg (2018) and Mortal Kombat (2021).

Career
McNamee secured a role in the Seven Network soap opera Home and Away playing the role of Lisa Duffy. She went on to play Sammy Rafter in the television series Packed to the Rafters. In 2009, McNamee was a contestant on the ninth series of Dancing with the Stars. She was partnered with dancer Stefano Olivieri and they were eliminated before the final.

The role of Sammy in Packed to the Rafters left McNamee keen to lose the "good girl" image the role created. In the series production breaks, she decided to take on different roles. She starred in the horror film The Loved Ones; which premiered at the Toronto International Film Festival in 2009. In mid-2010, she made the short film 50-50.

McNamee went on to secure a role in the 2012 film The Vow. She filmed the project in Toronto alongside Rachel McAdams and Channing Tatum. She described working on the film as a "surreal experience". In 2013, she returned to Packed to the Rafters for the final season as a special guest star. From 2014 to 2015, McNamee starred in the USA Network TV series Sirens. She played the role of Theresa Kelly, a Chicago police officer, and was a main character in the show. In 2017, she portrayed tennis player Margaret Court in Battle of the Sexes.

In 2018, McNamee played the lead role of Jenna alongside William Fichtner in the drama film The Neighbor. She played Lori, the ex-wife of megalodon hunter Jonas Taylor (Jason Statham), in the blockbuster The Meg. In 2019, McNamee appeared in the crime-thriller film Locusts, playing the role of Izzy. In August 2019, McNamee was cast in Mortal Kombat as Sonya Blade and it was released in April 2021.

In 2020, McNamee appeared in the horror film Black Water: Abyss. She also provided voice work in Rhys Wakefield's drama podcasrt series titled From Now. In 2021, McNamee was cast in the horror-thriller film The Visitor.

Personal life
McNamee was born in Sydney. She is the sister of actress Penny McNamee and they have two more sisters and a brother. Her niece is the actress Teagan Croft. Her cousin Daniel McNamee is in the band Art Vs Science. In April 2019, she married Patrick Caruso, a property developer.

In February 2010, McNamee became an ambassador for The Fred Hollows Foundation; the foundation focuses on treating and preventing blindness and other vision problems. McNamee represents The Foundation's 'Miracle Club', encouraging supporters to make monthly contributions that will restore sight to people in countries where The Foundation works.

Filmography

References

External links
 

1988 births
Australian film actresses
Actresses from Sydney
Australian soap opera actresses
Living people
21st-century Australian actresses